Jovana Milojević (born 24 July 1992) is a Serbian handball player for MKS Zagłębie Lubin and the Serbian national team.

She represented Serbia at the 2020 European Women's Handball Championship.

References

1992 births
Living people
Serbian female handball players
Sportspeople from Sremska Mitrovica
Expatriate handball players in Poland
Serbian expatriate sportspeople in Poland